The New Grafton Bridge, located  east of the Grafton Bridge and initially consisting of two lanes, opened to traffic on 12 December 2019.

History 
In 2002, the NSW Government commissioned a study into an additional crossing over Clarence River, released in early 2003.

In October 2008, federal, state and local government representatives inspected the existing bridge. It was claimed that this bridge was not coping with the increasing volume of traffic. Estimates of replacing the bridge were in the range of A$100 million. In December 2012, the Roads & Maritime Services (RMS) announced that a preferred option of an additional crossing of the Clarence River had been identified and went on public display for comment. RMS also announced that a final decision was expected during 2013. Construction commenced on the new crossing, known as 'New Grafton Bridge', in November 2016 and the bridge was opened on 12 December 2019 by Chris Gulaptis, the Member for Clarence. The New Grafton Bridge consists of two lanes and has been designed to be increased to four lanes when traffic levels require it. The bridge also carries a grade-separated footpath and cycleway.

Summerland Way was also rerouted from the old bridge onto the new bridge.

The New Grafton Bridge has not been named as of 2020 and there is a review by The Clarence Valley Council and Transport for NSW to enquire to the public to help name the bridge.

See also 

 List of bridges in Australia

References

External links 
 
 
 

Grafton, New South Wales
Steel bridges in Australia
Concrete bridges in Australia
Road bridges in New South Wales
Bridges completed in 2019
Girder bridges